Hyainailouroidea ("hyena-cats") is a paraphyletic superfamily of extinct predatory mammals from extinct order Hyaenodonta. Fossil remains of these mammals are known from middle Eocene to late Miocene deposits in North America, Europe, Africa and Asia.

Classification and phylogeny

Taxonomy
 Superfamily: †Hyainailouroidea (paraphyletic superfamily) 
 Family: †Hyainailouridae (paraphyletic family) 
 Family: †Prionogalidae 
 Family: †Teratodontidae

Phylogeny
The phylogenetic relationships of superfamily Hyainailouroidea are shown in the following cladogram:

See also
 Mammal classification
 Hyaenodonta

References

Hyaenodonts
Cenozoic mammals of North America
Cenozoic mammals of Asia
Cenozoic mammals of Europe
Cenozoic mammals of Africa